The 2021–22 Deutsche Eishockey Liga season was the 28th season since the founding of the Deutsche Eishockey Liga. It started on 9 September 2021 and ended on 4 May 2022.

The season was contested by 15 teams, as the 2020–21 DEL2 champion SC Bietigheim Steelers received a license. In February 2022, the DEL announced that only one team would be relegated, after only the Löwen Frankfurt applied for a license.

Teams

Regular season

Standings

Results

Playoffs

Bracket

Pre-playoffs
The pre-playoffs were played between 5 and 8 April 2022 in a best-of-three mode.

ERC Ingolstadt vs Kölner Haie

Nürnberg Ice Tigers vs Düsseldorfer EG

Quarterfinals
The quarterfinals were played between 10 and 18 April 2022 in a best-of-five mode.

Eisbären Berlin vs Kölner Haie

EHC Red Bull München vs Düsseldorfer EG

Grizzlys Wolfsburg vs Fischtown Pinguins

Straubing Tigers vs Adler Mannheim

Semifinals
The semifinals were played between 20 and 28 April 2022 in a best-of-five mode.

Eisbären Berlin vs Adler Mannheim

EHC Red Bull München vs Grizzlys Wolfsburg

Final
The final was played between 30 April and 4 May 2022 in a best-of-five mode.

Statistics

Scoring leaders
List shows the top skaters sorted by points, then goals.

Leading goaltenders
Only the top five goaltenders, based on save percentage, who have played at least 40% of their team's minutes, are included in this list.

Awards
The awards were announced on 11 April 2022.

References

External links
Official website

2021–22
DEL
2021–22 in German ice hockey